Galleh Baghan (also Romanized as Galleh Bāghān) is a village in Gughar Rural District, in the Central District of Baft County, Kerman Province, Iran. At the 2006 census, its population was 43, in 14 families.

References 

Populated places in Baft County